Cytoplasmic FMR1-interacting protein 1 is a protein that in humans is encoded by the CYFIP1 gene.

Interactions
CYFIP1 has been shown to interact with FMR1, to the exclusion of FXR1 and FXR2. It also forms part of the WAVE regulatory complex (WRC), and based on the crystal structure of the WRC it is believed CYFIP1 provides the binding site for the complex to Rac1.

References

Further reading

External links